Trush may refer to:

 Trush, Albania, a settlement in Shkodër County, northern Albania
 Trush Street, a city in Western Ukraine
 Ivan Trush (1869–1941), Ukrainian impressionist painter
 Dmitri Trush (born 1973), Olympic gymnast
 Volodymyr Trush (born 1980), Ukrainian politician

See also
 Thrush (disambiguation)